Armando Alemán (11 September 1904 – 21 January 1995) was a Spanish fencer. He competed in the individual foil event at the 1928 Summer Olympics.

References

External links
 

1904 births
1995 deaths
Spanish male foil fencers
Olympic fencers of Spain
Fencers at the 1928 Summer Olympics
Sportspeople from Córdoba, Spain